Eschata conspurcata is a moth in the family Crambidae. It was described by Frederic Moore in 1888. It is found in Darjeeling and Sikkim in India.

References

Chiloini
Moths described in 1888